Lewis Harris may refer to:

 Lewis Harris (rugby league), English rugby league player
 Lewis Harris (philanthropist) (1900–1983), New Zealand farmer, stock dealer and philanthropist
 Lewis Wormser Harris (1812–1876), bill-broker, financier and the first Jew elected Lord Mayor of Dublin

See also
 Lewis v. Harris, New Jersey Supreme Court case
 Lewis and Harris, in the Outer Hebrides, Scotland